Zarghona Anaa (died 1772), was an Afghan poet. She was the mother of Ahmad Shah Durrani (r. 1747–1772). 

She was married to Seman Khan. Her son conquered the Afghan throne in Kandahar in 1747. She was active as a poet, and enjoyed great respect for her ability as a poet and her strict adherence to the Pashtunwali moral code. She is known to have had great influence over the affairs of state through her son; she controlled Kandahar and acted as a mediator in Pashtun tribal conflicts in place of her son when he was on military campaign.

References 

Afghan women poets
18th-century Afghan people
1772 deaths
Durrani dynasty
18th-century Afghan poets